The 2017–18 Pittsburgh Panthers women's basketball team represents Pittsburgh University during the 2017–18 NCAA Division I women's basketball season. The Panthers, led by fifth year head coach Suzie McConnell-Serio, play their home games at the Petersen Events Center and were members of the Atlantic Coast Conference. They finished the season 10–20, 2–14 in ACC play to finish in a tie for thirteenth place. They lost in the first round of the ACC women's tournament to Wake Forest.

On April 5, McConnell-Serio was fired. She finished at Pittsburgh with a 5 year record of 67–87.

Previous season
They finished the season 13–17, 4–12 in ACC play to finish in a tie for eleventh place. They lost in the first round of the ACC women's tournament to North Carolina.

Media

Pitt Panthers Sports Network
The Pitt Panthers Sports Network will broadcast all Panthers games on WJAS. George Von Benko will provide the play-by-play while Jen Tuscano will provide the analysis. Non-televised home games can be watched online via Pitt Panthers TV with the Panthers Sports Network call.

Roster

Schedule

|-
!colspan=9 style=|Exhibition

|-
!colspan=9 style=| Regular season

|-
!colspan=9 style=| ACC Women's Tournament

Rankings
2017–18 NCAA Division I women's basketball rankings

References

Pittsburgh Panthers women's basketball seasons
Pittsburgh
Pittsburgh
Pittsburgh